The Albatros L 72 was a German transport aircraft of the 1920s, designed to carry newspapers between German cities for Ullstein Verlag. A single revised example was built for the Hamburger Fremdenblatt.

Design and development
The L 72 was a single-engine biplane of conventional configuration with unstaggered wings of equal span. It was the first German commercial aircraft to incorporate leading edge slots and trailing-edge flaps. The upper and lower wings were interchangeable. They were of all metal construction with fabric covering. The thickened centre section of the upper wing contained the fuel tanks. The upper wing was carried on a tubular cabane and one set of 'N' formation interplane struts was provided with stream-lined wire bracing. The fuselage was built of welded steel tubing with diagonal wire bracing and was fabric covered. Aft of the pilot's cockpit was a cabin containing a conveyor-like device which could accept up to sixteen parcels of newspapers weighing  each. These could then be dropped, either by an attendant travelling in the cabin or by the pilot, an indicator in the cockpit indicating how many parcels had been dropped. A novel feature of the tail was the rudder and fin which were both pivoted in such a way that when the rudder was turned the fin also turned around a vertical axis thus providing a more powerful rudder control for a smaller angular movement

Variants
 L 72a 
 L 72b - two examples for Ullstein AG
 L 72c Albis - one example for Hamburger Fremdenblatt

Specifications (L.72a)

See also

References

 
"Albatros 72A Flight 15 April 1926 pp. 228–231
 German Aircraft between 1919-1945
 luftfahrt-archiv.de

Single-engined tractor aircraft
Biplanes
1920s German cargo aircraft
L 072
Aircraft first flown in 1926